3-Aminopropylphosphinic acid, also known in the literature as 3-APPA or CGP 27492, is a compound used in scientific research which acts as an agonist at the GABAB receptor. It is part of a class of phosphinic acid GABAB agonists, which also includes SKF-97,541. It has a binding affinity (pKi) to the GABAB receptor of 8.30 (i.e. ~3nM).

References 

GABAB receptor agonists
Phosphinic acids